Rasti (also Romanized as Rāstī; also known as Maḩalleh-ye Rāstī) is a village in Sakhvid Rural District, Nir District, Taft County, Yazd Province, Iran. At the 2006 census, its population was 60, in 24 families.

References 

Populated places in Taft County